Gümüşhane Örenşar Airport  is a planned public airport at Örenşar village of Köse district in Gümüşhane, Türkiye.

The Gümüşhane Örenşar Airport is being re-developed on its current STOLport location that was built back in 1995. Despite the finished feasibility plans, the tender to build the airport has not been issued yet.

Geography and Transport

Airport is close to Örenşar, Salyazı, Bizgili, Gökçeköy, Yaylım, Bayrampaşa, Oylumdere, Çakıröz, Altıntaş, Özbeyli, Çatalçeşme, Kabaktepe, Eymür, Yuvacık, Çayıryolu, Yenice, Kitre, Manas, Tomlacık, Beyçam, Kocayokuş, Karayaşmak, Övünce, Nazlıçayır, Güvercindere, Çalık, and Çerçi villages; Gökçedere, Öbektaş, Arzularkabaköy, Arpalı, and Ünlüpınar towns; Demirözü, Köse, Kelkit, Otlukbeli, and Aydıntepe district centers.

The routes from the airport to nearby cities are these:

To Bayburt (Based on the Bayburt University Bâberti Complex.)
 (38 km., 41 min.) D052 (Bayburt direction)
 (40 km., 50 min.) D052 (Bayburt direction) - Çayıryolu - Tomlacık - Rüştü - 69-50 (Bayburt direction) - D052 (Bayburt direction)
 (41 km., 53 min.) D052 (Bayburt direction) - Kırkpınar locality - Danişment - D052 (Bayburt direction)
 (48 km., 57 min.) D052 (Bayburt direction) - 29-34 (Demirözü direction) - 69-54 (Demirözü direction) - Çatalçeşme - Demirözü - 69-50 (Bayburt direction) - D052 (Bayburt direction)
 (60 km., 63 min.) D052 (Bayburt direction) - Salyazı Pond - Salyazı - Kırklar Cave (Altıntaş) - Kocayokuş - D050 (Bayburt direction) - Korgan Bridge (Akşar) - D052 (Köse direction)
 (61 km., 61 min.) D052 (Bayburt direction) - 29-31 (Kitre, Çerçi direction) - D050 (Bayburt direction) - Korgan Bridge (Akşar) - D052 (Köse direction)

To Gümüşhane (Based on the Gümüşhane University Library.)
 (48 km., 58 min.) D052 (Bayburt direction) - Salyazı Pond - Salyazı - Kırklar Cave (Altıntaş) - Yenice - Beyçam - D050 (Gümüşhane direction, opposite side) - Tohumoğlu Bridge (Yeniyol) - D885 (Gümüşhane direction) - Çağırgan Baba Tomb (Tekke) - 29-01 (city center direction)
 (51 km., 59 min.) D052 (Bayburt direction) - Salyazı Pond - Salyazı - Kırklar Cave (Altıntaş) - Yenice - Nazlıçayır - Sargınkaya - D050 (Gümüşhane direction, opposite side) - Keçi Castle (Kale) - Tohumoğlu Bridge (Yeniyol) - D885 (Gümüşhane direction) - Çağırgan Baba Tomb (Tekke) - 29-01 (city center direction)
 (52 km., 63 min.) D052 (Köse direction) - Yaylım Church - Beyçam - D050 (Gümüşhane direction, opposite side) - Tohumoğlu Bridge (Yeniyol) - D885 (Gümüşhane direction) - Çağırgan Baba Tomb (Tekke) - 29-01 (city center direction)
 (52 km., 73 min.) D052 (Bayburt direction) - Salyazı Pond - Salyazı - Kırklar Cave (Altıntaş) - Yenice - Nazlıçayır - Tamzı - Keçikaya - Kale - D050 (Gümüşhane direction, opposite side) - Keçi Castle (Kale) - 29-25 (Yağmurdere direction) - Harmancık - D885 (Gümüşhane direction) - Çağırgan Baba Tomb (Tekke) - 29-01 (city center direction)
 (53 km., 58 min.) D052 (Köse direction) - Köse - D885 (Gümüşhane direction) - Köse Dam Lake - Sungurbeyli Plateau - Pirahmet Tomb - Çağırgan Baba Tomb (Tekke) - 29-01 (city center direction)
 (54 km., 61 min.) D052 (Bayburt direction) - Salyazı Pond - Salyazı - Kırklar Cave (Altıntaş) - Kocayokuş - D050 (Gümüşhane direction, opposite side) - Keçi Castle (Kale) - Tohumoğlu Bridge (Yeniyol) - D885 (Gümüşhane direction) - Çağırgan Baba Tomb (Tekke) - 29-01 (city center direction)
 (60 km., 62 min.) D052 (Bayburt direction) - 29-31 (Kitre, Çerçi direction) - D050 (Gümüşhane direction, opposite side) - Keçi Castle (Kale) - Tohumoğlu Bridge (Yeniyol) - D885 (Gümüşhane direction) - Çağırgan Baba Tomb (Tekke) - 29-01 (city center direction)

References

External links
 Salyazı Havaalanı Ulaştırma Bakanlığı PlanlarıArasına Girdi at gumushane.gen.tr 
 Gümüşhane Havaalanı Projesi  at ucuyorum.com 
 Köse Havaalanı İçin Teknik Heyet Gümüşhane'de at gumushane.gen.tr 
 Havaalanı için Teknik Heyet geldi at Gümüşhane Kuşakkaya 

Proposed airports in Turkey
Buildings and structures in Gümüşhane Province